Brian Baker and Matt Reid were the defending champions but chose not to defend their title.

Brydan Klein and Joe Salisbury won the title after defeating Hans Hach Verdugo and Dennis Novikov 6–3, 4–6, [10–3] in the final.

Seeds

Draw

References
 Main Draw

Las Vegas Challenger - Doubles
Las Vegas Challenger